Cetatea de Baltă is a commune in Alba County, Transylvania, Romania. The commune is composed of four villages: Cetatea de Baltă, Crăciunelu de Sus (Christendorf; Felsőkarácsonyfalva), Sântămărie (Frauenkirch; Boldogfalva) and Tătârlaua (Taterloch; Felsőtatárlaka).

Geography
The commune is located in the northeastern corner of the county, on the border with Sibiu and Mureș counties. It is traversed by county road DJ 117, which connects it to Târnăveni,  to the northeast, and to Blaj,  to the southeast; the county seat, Alba Iulia, is some  past Blaj.

To the east it borders with Adămuș commune from Mureș County and with Bazna commune from Sibiu County, to the south and west with Valea Lungă commune, and to the west and north with Jidvei commune.

Cetatea de Baltă lies on the left bank of the river Târnava Mică. The river  
Balta which discharges into the Târnava Mică in the village of Sântămărie. The river Tătârlaua is a left tributary of the river Balta; it discharges into the Balta in the village of Tătârlaua.

Population 
At the 2011 census, the commune had 2,798 inhabitants, of whom 48.4% were Romanians, 33.3% Roma, 17.8% Hungarians, and 0.5% Germans.

The villages by ethnic majority, as of 2002:

Touristic sights
The Bethlen Castle, built in the 16th century in the French Renaissance style and restored in the 17th-18th centuries in the Baroque style.
A fortress (1st century BC-1st century AD), today only ruins.
The Reformed Church, a 13th-century building.

Economy

The most important economic resource is agriculture. Cetatea de Baltă is part of the Târnave Vineyard, making viticulture an essential component of the local economy.

References

Communes in Alba County
Localities in Transylvania